The Wätterlatte is a mountain of the Bernese Alps, located east of Reichenbach im Kandertal in the Bernese Oberland. It lies on the range west of the Schwalmere, that separates the Suldtal from the Kiental.

References

External links
 Wätterlatte on Hikr

Mountains of the Alps
Mountains of Switzerland
Mountains of the canton of Bern
Two-thousanders of Switzerland